In molecular biology, the term extrinsic pathway may refer to multiple cascades of protein interactions.

 The extrinsic pathway of apoptosis refers to cell death induced by external factors that activate the death-inducing signaling complex.
 The extrinsic pathway of blood coagulation is also known as the tissue factor pathway and refers to a cascade of enzymatic reactions resulting in blood clotting and is done with the addition of injured tissue cells.

a number of extracurricular molecules is specialised to induce apoptosis.These extracurricular signals molecules bind with cell surface receptors (termed death receptors).